The 2008–09 CWHL season is the second season of the Canadian Women's Hockey League (CWHL). The Montreal Stars repeated as regular season champions, winning 25 of 30 games, and won CWHL Championship. Caroline Ouellette was voted the league's regular-season Most Valuable Player. Jayna Hefford won the Angela James Bowl with 69 points and was also voted the CWHL Top Forward. Becky Kellar was voted the CWHL Top Defender, Kim St-Pierre was voted the CWHL Top Goaltender, and Laura Hosier was voted the CWHL Outstanding Rookie.

Regular season
En route to winning this season's Angela James Bowl as the scoring champion, Jayna Hefford became the first player in CWHL history to record 100 career points (having finished second in the previous, inaugural CWHL season's scoring race) She recorded the milestone on January 17, 2009, in a win over the Montreal Stars.

Final standings
Note: GP = Games played, W = Wins, L = Losses, OTL = Overtime Losses, SOL = Shootout Losses, GF = Goals for, GA = Goals against, Pts = Points.

Playoffs

Brampton vs. Mississauga
March 14: Brampton 3, Mississauga 2
March 15: Mississauga 4, Brampton 1

Burlington vs. Montreal
March 14: Montreal 6, Burlington 1
March 15: Burlington 3, Montreal 1

Montreal Stars won the CWHL Championship

Awards and honours

 Most Valuable Player: Caroline Ouellette, Montreal
 Angela James Bowl: Top Scorer Jayna Hefford, Brampton
 Outstanding Rookie: Laura Hosier, Brampton

CWHL Top Players
 Top Forward: Jayna Hefford, Brampton
 Top Defender: Becky Kellar, Burlington
 Top Goaltender: Kim St-Pierre, Montreal

CWHL All-Stars
First Team All-Stars
 Goaltender: Kim St-Pierre, Montreal
 Defender: Cheryl Pounder, Mississauga
 Defender: Becky Kellar, Burlington
 Forward: Jayna Hefford, Brampton
 Forward: Caroline Ouellette, Montreal
 Forward: Jennifer Botterill, Mississauga
Second Team All-Stars
 Goaltender: Sami Jo Small, Mississauga
 Defender: Bobbi Jo Slusar, Brampton
 Defender: Ashley Pendleton, Brampton
 Forward: Jana Harrigan, Burlington
 Forward: Lara Perks, Mississauga
 Forward: Sabrina Harbec, Montreal

CWHL All-Rookie Team
 Goaltender: Laura Hosier, Brampton
 Defender: Annie Guay, Montreal
 Defender: Shannon Moulson, Mississauga
 Forward: Noemie Marin, Montreal
 Forward: Brooke Beazer, Brampton
 Forward: Amanda Parkins, Burlington

Monthly Top Scorers
 October: Sabrina Harbec, Montreal (8+11=19 points, 6 games)
 November: Caroline Ouellette, Montreal (8+11=19 points, 6 games)
 December: Caroline Ouellette, Montreal (7+10=17 points, 6 games)
 January: Noemie Marin, Montreal (10+9=19 points, 9 games)
 February: Jennifer Botterill, Mississauga (10+7=17 points, 6 games)

Clarkson Cup 
 Montreal Stars won the Clarkson Cup by defeating  3–1 the Minnesota Whitecaps (WWHL)

References

See also
 Canadian Women's Hockey League
 Clarkson Cup

 
Canadian Women's Hockey League seasons
CW